is the songwriter of J-Pop group Girl Next Door. He debuted as Rubii in 1998. 

1978 births
Japanese composers
Japanese male composers
Japanese male musicians
Living people
Musicians from Kanagawa Prefecture
People from Kanagawa Prefecture